Jim Fernie (born 31 October 1936) is a Scottish footballer, who played for Arbroath, Doncaster Rovers, Montrose and Forfar Athletic.

References

External links

1936 births
Living people
Association football inside forwards
Scottish footballers
Newburgh F.C. players
Arbroath F.C. players
Doncaster Rovers F.C. players
Montrose F.C. players
Forfar Athletic F.C. players
Scottish Football League players
English Football League players
Footballers from Kirkcaldy
Scottish expatriate footballers
Expatriate soccer players in Australia
Scottish expatriate sportspeople in Australia
Melbourne Knights FC players